John Bourchier, 2nd Earl of Bath,  (1499 in Devon – 10 February 1560/61) was an Earl in the peerage of England. He also succeeded to the titles of 12th Baron FitzWarin, Baron Daubeney and 4th Count of Eu.

Origins
He was the son of John Bourchier, 1st Earl of Bath and Cecily Daubeney. He was the first cousin of Anne Stanhope, daughter of the 1st Earl of Bath's sister, Elizabeth Bourchier. Upon her marriage to Edward Seymour, 1st Duke of Somerset, she became the sister-in-law to Queen Jane Seymour and therefore the Aunt of King Edward VI. After the death of Henry VIII, his widow, Catherine Parr, married Thomas Seymour, 1st Baron Seymour of Sudeley. This made Anne the sister-in-law to two English queens.

Career
In 1519 he was appointed Sheriff of Somerset and Sheriff of Dorset and was knighted in 1523. On the death of King Edward VI (1547–1553), he was one of the first to declare Queen Mary his rightful heir. He was invested as a Privy Counsellor in 1533, and served as a Commissioner at the coronation of Queen Mary. Bourchier was also a commissioner at the trial of Lady Jane Grey.

Other offices held by him included: Lord-Lieutenant of Cornwall, Lord-Lieutenant of Devon, Lord-Lieutenant of Dorset and Governor of Beaumaris Castle.

Landholdings
In 1539 he was granted by King Henry VIII the manors of Hackpen, Sheldon, Bolham and Saint Hill, having already inherited the feudal barony of Okehampton from his grandmother, Elizabeth Dynham.

Marriages

John Bourchier married three times:
Firstly to Elizabeth (or Isabel) Hungerford, daughter of Sir Walter Hungerford (died 1516), of Farleigh, younger son of Robert Hungerford, 3rd Baron Hungerford (1428–1464). By Elizabeth he had one daughter:
Elizabeth Bourchier
Secondly (before 25 May 1524) to Eleanor Manners, daughter of George Manners, 11th Baron de Ros by his wife Anne St. Leger. By Eleanor he had children including:
Elizabeth Bourchier b. 1518 d. 2 Oct. 1569 wife of Sir Richard Thomas Chase of Hundrich 
John Bourchier, Lord FitzWarin, who predeceased his father. He married his step-sister Frances Kitson (died 1586), the daughter of his father's 3rd wife from her 1st marriage to Sir Thomas Kitson (died 1540) (see below). Her monument with recumbent effigy exists in Tawstock Church and is covered by the earliest six-columned canopy in Devon. His son by Frances Kitson was William Bourchier, 3rd Earl of Bath.
George Bourchier,  soldier  and  statesman  in  Ireland; father of Henry Bourchier, 5th Earl of Bath.

Thirdly, on 4 December 1548, to Margaret Donnington (died 1562) daughter and sole heiress of John Donnington (died 1544) of Stoke Newington, a member of the Worshipful Company of Salters, by his wife Elizabeth Pye. Margaret Donnington was the widow successively of Sir Thomas Kitson (died 1540), the builder of Hengrave Hall in Suffolk, and next of Sir Richard Long (died 1546) of Wiltshire, Great Saxham and Shingay, Cambridgeshire, Gentleman of the Privy Chamber to King Henry VIII. Margaret Donnington was a strong-minded lady who insisted that at the same time as her marriage to Bourchier, his son and heir should marry her own daughter Frances Kitson. The double marriage took place at Hengrave on 11 December 1548. Thus the 2nd Earl's eldest son from his 2nd marriage to Eleanor Manners, John Bourchier, Lord FitzWarin (who predeceased his father), married his own step-sister, Francesca Kitson, and was by her the father of William Bourchier, 3rd Earl of Bath. Margaret Donnington and Bourchier made Hengrave their home and Bourchier was buried at Hengrave. Stained glass in the cloister of Hengrave Hall survives memorialising the Bourchier residency, showing ten quarterings of Bourchier (Bourchier, Louvaine, FitzWarin, Audley, Cogan, Hankford, Stapledon,<ref>Misidentified in Rokewood, p.219 as "Gules, two bendlets wavy or for Brewer. In this 7th position are shown elsewhere the arms of Stapledon (of Annery, Monkleigh): Argent, two bars wavy sable, e.g. on monument of Lady Frances Bourchier (died 1612) in the Earl of Bedford's Chenies Chapel, Bucks. (www.middlesex-heraldry.org.uk) & sculpted on the gatehouse of Tawstock Court, Devon). Rokewood's footnotes confirm that argent and sable could be the correct tinctures in the poorly preserved glass.</ref> Martin, Dinham, Arches) impaling Donnington (Argent, three pallets azure on a chief gules three bezants'')

Children and succession
His eldest son by his second marriage John Bourchier, Lord FitzWarin predeceased his father, having married (on 11 December 1548 at Hengrave) his step-sister Frances Kitson, daughter of Sir Thomas Kitson of Hengrave Hall by Margaret Donnington. Their son William Bourchier, 3rd Earl of Bath (1557–1623), therefore succeeded his grandfather in the earldom, aged under 1 year old. The title became extinct in 1654 on the death of the 5th Earl.

Death and burial
He died on 10 February 1560/61 and was buried on 10 March at Hengrave, Suffolk.

References

|-

1499 births
1561 deaths
High Sheriffs of Somerset
Lord-Lieutenants of Cornwall
Lord-Lieutenants of Devon
Lord-Lieutenants of Dorset
2
Bourchier
John, Bath
15th-century English people
16th-century English nobility
High Sheriffs of Dorset